Hope Mountain, commonly called Mount Hope, is a prominent mountain overlooking the town of Hope, British Columbia, Canada from the south. It is the northernmost summit of the Skagit Range of the Cascade Mountains and stands above the confluence of the Coquihalla and Fraser Rivers. Hope Mountain dominates the view of southbound travellers in the lower Fraser Canyon between Yale and Hope.

References

Canadian Cascades
Mountains of the Lower Mainland
One-thousanders of British Columbia
Yale Division Yale Land District